Shane Lee Mack (born December 7, 1963) is an American former professional baseball outfielder in Major League Baseball (MLB).

Career
Mack played for Richard Gahr High School in Cerritos, California, from 1978-1981. Upon graduation, he accepted an athletic scholarship to play for the UCLA Bruins baseball team where he starred from 1982-1984. His career college statistics include a .361 batting average, 29 home runs, 142 runs batted in, 158 runs scored and 44 stolen bases. Mack was the runner-up for the Pac-10 Conference Most Valuable Player (MVP) in 1983. His .419 batting average that year was the seventh best all-time in the Pac-10. Mack was selected to the All-Pac-10 and All-American College Baseball Teams in 1983 and 1984.

Following college, he played on the U.S. Olympic baseball team which won a silver medal in the 1984 Olympic Games in Los Angeles. Subsequently, he played nine professional major league seasons. His career statistics include a .299 lifetime batting average, 80 home runs, and 398 RBIs in 923 games. Defensively, he recorded a .985 fielding percentage at all three outfield positions. Mack started his career with the San Diego Padres. In , he was selected in the rule 5 draft by the Minnesota Twins where he starred from -. Notably, he was a key component of the Twins' 1991 World Series championship team. In  Mack had his best year, hitting .315 (fifth in the American League), scoring 101 runs (seventh in the AL), stealing 26 bases, driving in 75 runs, and hitting 16 home runs.

After playing in Japan for the Yomiuri Giants in 1995 & 1996, he returned to the United States to play ball for the Boston Red Sox in the  season. He then played for the Oakland Athletics and the Kansas City Royals in  before retiring.

Mack was inducted into the UCLA Athletics Hall of Fame on October 10, 2002.

On March 6, 2006, having been informed of the grave condition of former teammate Kirby Puckett, who had gone blind in one eye a few years before, due to glaucoma, and who had suffered a massive stroke the previous day, Mack flew to Arizona to be with him along with a number of other current and former Twins.

His brother is former major league outfielder Quinn Mack.

External links

1963 births
Living people
Major League Baseball left fielders
Major League Baseball center fielders
Minnesota Twins players
San Diego Padres players
Boston Red Sox players
Oakland Athletics players
Kansas City Royals players
Baseball players from Los Angeles
African-American baseball players
American expatriate baseball players in Japan
Baseball players at the 1984 Summer Olympics
Yomiuri Giants players
UCLA Bruins baseball players
Medalists at the 1984 Summer Olympics
Olympic silver medalists for the United States in baseball
Olympic medalists in baseball
People from Cerritos, California
All-American college baseball players
Beaumont Golden Gators players
Las Vegas Stars (baseball) players
21st-century African-American people
20th-century African-American sportspeople
Alaska Goldpanners of Fairbanks players